The siege of Sisauranon took place in 541 between Byzantine forces under Belisarius and the Sassanian garrison of the Sisauranon fortress under Bleschames.

The Romans employed several approaches, including stratagems and assaults. The garrison eventually surrendered and defected after the Byzantines received information about the fort being without supplies.

Background

In 541, the Byzantine emperor Justinian I sent Belisarius to launch a campaign in the East. The latter set out from Dara together with his Gothic forces and Ghassanid allies. They camped near Nisibis, trying to lure out the Persian garrison and defeat them in the field before beginning a regular siege, but this was unsuccessful as the Persian garrison under Nabedes performed a surprise raid and retreated to the fortified city.

Belisarius gave up, and instead commenced a siege against Sisauranon, a nearby frontier fortress. Sisauranon was held by a garrison consisting of 800 Persian cavalrymen.

Siege

A Roman assault against the fort was defeated with heavy losses, and the attackers were only saved by a well-directed charge by Ostrogothic cavalrymen. As a result, Belisarius decided to institute a blockade by investing the fort, and in order to secure his besieging forces, he dispatched the Ghassanid Arabs under Al-Harith ibn Jabalah to raid the region across the Tigris river. Apparently, he did not trust the Arab king, and sent 1,200 Roman regulars, mostly his own hypaspistai, to accompany the raiding part. The raiders received information from a captured Persian that Sisauranon has little or no supplies. With this information, Belisarius gained the upper hand in the subsequent negotiation with the Persian garrison. They reached a settlement as the Persians went over to the Byzantine side and were immediately shipped off to Italy to fight alongside the Byzantine army in the ongoing Gothic War.

The sweltering heat of Mesopotamia caused serious illness in the Roman camp, which forced Belisarius to halt the campaign. The sick were transported back home in carts. The raiding party failed to return or give any information on their movements. Procopius alleged that the Arabs wanted to keep all the booty.

Aftermath
The defected Persian garrison went on to take part in the Gothic War. They participated in the Siege of Verona and the Battle of Faventia. Among them was one Artabazes, whose men took over the city gate in Verona and participated in single combat in Faventina.

Footnotes

Notes

References
 

Sisauranon 541
Sisauranon 541
541
Sisauranon
540s in the Byzantine Empire
Sisauranon 541
Arbayistan
Battles involving the Goths
Byzantine–Sasanian War of 540–562